Hardway is a suburb of the town of Gosport, in the Gosport district, in Hampshire, England. The suburb is made up of a few industrial estates, residential housing and a port. The suburb sits on otherthe side of Portsmouth Harbour to the naval base.

Populated coastal places in Hampshire
Gosport